Venetian Dalmatia refers to parts of Dalmatia under the rule of the Republic of Venice, mainly from the 15th to the 18th centuries. Dalmatia was first sold to Venice in 1409 but Venetian Dalmatia was not fully consolidated from 1420. It lasted until 1797, when the Republic of Venice fell to the forces of Napoleon Bonaparte and Habsburg Austria.

Geography

The Republic of Venice had possessions in the Balkans and in the eastern Mediterranean Sea, including Venetian Albania in the Adriatic Sea and the Venetian Ionian Islands in western Greece. Its possessions in Dalmatia stretched from the Istria peninsula to what is today coastal Montenegro: they included all the Dalmatian islands and the mainland territories from the central Velebit mountains to the northern borders of the Republic of Ragusa. With the 1718 Treaty of Passarowitz, Venice enlarged its possessions in Dalmatia to their greatest extent: it made some small advances, taking the areas of Signa, Imotski and Vrgorac in the Dalmatian hinterland.

History

Middle Ages

Beginning with Doge Pietro II Orseolo, who ruled Venice from 991 AD, Venetian attention towards mainland Veneto was definitely overshadowed by a strong push towards the control of the Adriatic Sea. Inner strife was pacified, and trade with the Byzantine Empire boosted by the favourable treaty (Grisobolus or Golden Bull) with Emperor Basil II. The imperial edict granted Venetian traders freedom from taxation paid by other foreigners and the Byzantines themselves. In 1000 AD an expedition of Venetian ships in coastal Istria and Dalmatia secured Venetian suzerainty in the area, and the Narentine pirates were suppressed permanently. On this occasion Doge Orseolo named himself "Duke of Dalmatia", starting the colonial empire of Venice. He was also responsible of the establishment of the famous "Marriage of the Sea" ceremony. At this time Venice had a firm control over the Adriatic Sea, strengthened by the expedition of Pietro's son Ottone in 1017.

The creation of Venice's overseas empire began with the conquest of Dalmatia and reached its greatest nominal extent at the conclusion of the Fourth Crusade in 1204, with the declaration of the acquisition of three octaves of the Byzantine Empire.

In 1409, during the 20-year Hungarian civil war between King Sigismund and the Neapolitan house of Anjou, the losing contender, Ladislaus of Naples, sold his "rights" on Dalmatia to the Venetian Republic for a meager sum of 100,000 ducats. Sigismund tried to recover the territory but Venice defeated his troops in the battle of Motta.

The more centralized merchant republic took control of the cities by 1420 (with the exception of the Republic of Ragusa); they were to remain under Venetian rule for a period of 377 years (1420–1797). The southernmost area of Dalmatia (now part of coastal Montenegro) was called Venetian Albania during that time.

Ottoman–Venetian Wars

In the period between the start of the Ottoman–Venetian War (1499–1503) and the end of Ottoman–Venetian War (1537–40), the Ottoman Empire made significant advances in the Dalmatian hinterland - it didn't occupy the Venetian cities, but it took the Croatian possessions between Skradin and Karin, eliminating them as a buffer zone between the Ottoman and Venetian territory. The economy of the Venetian cities in Dalmatia, severely impacted by the Turkish occupation of the hinterland in the previous war, recovered and held steady even throughout this war.

Cretan War

The Dalmatian front was a separate theater of operations, which was involved in the early phase of the war. The conditions there were almost reverse to those in Crete: for the Ottomans, it was too far away and relatively insignificant, while the Venetians operated near their own bases of supply and had undisputed control of the sea, being thus able to easily reinforce their coastal strongholds. The Ottomans launched a large-scale attack in 1646, and made some significant gains, including the capture of the islands of Krk, Pag and Cres, and most importantly, the supposedly impregnable fortress of Novigrad, which surrendered on 4 July, after only two days of bombardment. The Turks were now able to threaten the two main Venetian strongholds in Dalmatia, Zadar and Split. In the next year however, the tide turned, as the Venetian commander Leonardo Foscolo seized several forts, retook Novigrad, temporarily captured the fortress of Knin and took Klis, while a month-long siege of the fortress of Šibenik by the Ottomans in August and September failed. During the next few years, military operations stalled because of an outbreak of famine and plague amongst the Venetians at Zadar, while both sides focused their resources in the Aegean area. As other fronts took priority for the Ottomans, no further operations occurred in the Dalmatian theater. Peace in 1669 found the Republic of Venice with significant gains in Dalmatia, its territory tripled, and its control of the Adriatic thus secured.

Morean War

In October 1683, the population of Venetian Dalmatia, principally Uskoks of Ravni kotari, took arms and together with the rayah (lower class) of the Ottoman frontier regions rose up, taking Skradin, Karin, Vrana, Benkovac and Obrovac.

In the Morean War, the Republic of Venice besieged Sinj in October 1684 and then again March and April 1685, but both times without success. In the 1685 attempt, the Venetian armies were aided by the local militia of the Republic of Poljica, who thereby rebelled against their nominal Ottoman suzerainty that had existed since 1513. In an effort to retaliate to Poljica, in June 1685, the Ottomans attacked Zadvarje, and in July 1686 Dolac and Srijane, but were pushed back, and suffered major casualties. With the help of the local population of Poljica as well as the Morlachs, the fortress of Sinj finally fell to the Venetian army on 30 September 1686. On 1 September 1687 the siege of Herceg Novi started, and ended with a Venetian victory on 30 September. Knin was taken after a twelve-day siege on 11 September 1688. The capture of the Knin Fortress marked the end of the successful Venetian campaign to expand their territory in inland Dalmatia, and it also determined much of the final border between Dalmatia and Bosnia and Herzegovina that stands today. The Ottomans would besiege Sinj again in the Second Morean War, but would be repelled.

On 26 November 1690, Venice took Vrgorac, which opened the route towards Imotski and Mostar. In 1694 they managed to take areas north of the Republic of Ragusa, namely Čitluk, Gabela, Zažablje, Trebinje, Popovo, Klobuk and Metković. In the final peace treaty, Venice did relinquish the areas of Popovo polje as well as Klek and Sutorina, to maintain the pre-existing demarcation near Ragusa.

The "Linea Mocenigo"  in 1718 Dalmatia was named after Sebastiano Mocenigo, one of the last famous Doges of Venice. Indeed, in Dalmatia -after the Treaty of Passarowitz- he obtained some small advances for his Dalmatia, taking the areas of Signo and Imoschi in the hinterland. That was the last enlargement of Venetian Dalmatia (that partially enjoyed the "Age of Enlightment" experienced by Venice during Illuminism) until the Napoleon conquest in 1797. However, Venetians lost Čitluk and Gabela to Ottomans according to this treaty.

Last decades

In 1797 AD, during the Napoleonic wars, the Republic of Venice was dissolved. The Venetian Dalmatia was included in the Napoleonic Kingdom of Italy from 1805 to 1809 AD (the Republic of Ragusa was included in 1808 AD), and later in the Illyrian Provinces from 1809 AD. After the final defeat of Napoleon, the entire territory was granted to the Austrian Empire by the Congress of Vienna in 1815 AD.

Demographic history

Venetian Dalmatia was inhabited by autochthonous Romance-speaking people and by Slavic-speaking people (who arrived in Dalmatia after 640 AD).  The Romance population spoke the Dalmatian language and the Venetian language, and also Italian language and Latin language.  However, it is possible that ethnically, the Venetians were an earlier arrival of Slavic people, given that the name Veneti has etymological connection to "Wend," the German word for "Slav", and Tacitus informs us that the "Adriatic Veneti" of his period (AD 1st c.) were related to the "Vistula Veneti," the region of Proto-Slavic homeland in Poland by the Vistula River.

The Slavonic Croat population spoke Shtokavian dialect of Slavonic which is today called Croatian. 

The Romance population had already become a minority in the Early Middle Ages, living mostly in the coastal areas, with smaller pockets in the hinterland. Merchants and soldiers from Venice settled the Dalmatian cities over the centuries, mixing with the already present Romance population. During Ottoman rule in the hinterlands Orthodox people, mostly Serbs, started arriving in the northern parts of the hinterland, as well as Romance-speaking Vlachs, part of whom were Orthodox and part of whom were Catholic, and after the Venetian takeover of most of the hinterland during the Great Turkish War the Croat population in the hinterlands was greatly reinforced by new Croat settlers fleeing from Ottoman Bosnia. Over time the Croats assimilated the Catholic Vlachs, while the Serbs assimilated the Orthodox ones. The Romance-speakers in the coastal areas were more resilient to assimilation (in great part due to their prestige status) and after the fall of the Republic, during the national movements of the 19th century, had mostly adopted an Italian national identity.

The Dalmatian population adhered to Roman Catholicism in the maritime areas, the urban areas on the coast as well as much of the hinterland, while Eastern Orthodoxy was dominant in the northern part of the hinterland, as Serbs and Orthodox Vlachs settled the area from the 16th century onwards.

Administration

Dalmatian administration was in the hands of a few Venetian officials, who were headed by a governor (proveditore generale), who changed every three years. The Venetian nobility competed for this service, because it was honorable and lucrative. Providur ruled like an independent ruler, having a court in Zadar, a splendid bodyguard and a suit resembling a doge. The power of the providor was unlimited, and he was also the last instance for the court, finances, army, even for the church. Venetian Dalmatia was divided into districts (distretto), headed by a prince (conte) appointed by the providor. The prince is flanked by two officials, the chancellor (chancelliere) for judicial affairs and the camerlingo for financial affairs. The small number of Venetian officials was poorly paid, so they were forced to take from collected taxes and other public duties to the detriment of the Venetian Republic. However, the taxes were not too high, because the Republic wanted to spread discontent in the hard-won Dalmatia. They were paid only by peasants, because nobles and citizens were exempted not only from all taxes, but also from all duties. Each city municipality had its own statute, so there is no uniqueness in Dalmatia. Likewise, weights and measures differed from place to place. The municipal administration was shared by nobles and citizens, who gathered for assemblies, where municipal affairs were discussed. In some municipalities, only the nobles met for assemblies, and in some the citizens also had their own assemblies. Civil and criminal affairs were handled by the city (municipal) prince, and police affairs were carried out by grand and petty judges. Peasants met in brotherhoods in gatherings, where they discussed their needs. Otherwise, in every village there was a leader called harambaša, who was in charge of civil and military affairs. During peacetime, the peasants formed some companies, and they were called cops. Their duty was to keep an eye on the movement of border Bosnian Turks, and to watch over security at home. At that time, each district had its own colonel, with serdars and serdars as lower officers. The islanders served only in the Venetian navy. The Italian language was spoken mainly in the cities, while Croatian was used in other areas.

Legacy

The legacy from Venice in Dalmatia is huge and very important, mainly in the cultural and artistic area. Venice was one of the centers of Italian Renaissance, when the Republic of Venice dominated Dalmatia, and the Venetian Dalmatia enjoyed the benefits of this fact. From Giorgio Orsini to the influence on the early contemporary Croatian literature, Venice made its Dalmatia the most western-oriented civilized area of the Balkans, mostly in the cities.

Some architectural works from that period of Dalmatia are of European importance, and would contribute to further development of the Renaissance: the Cathedral of St James in Šibenik and the Chapel of Blessed John in Trogir.

Indeed, the Croatian renaissance, strongly influenced by Venetian and Italian literature, was thoroughly developed on the coastal parts of Croatia. The beginning of the Croatian 16th-century literal activity was marked by a Dalmatian humanist Marco Marulo and his epic book Judita, which has been written by incorporating peculiar motives and events from the classical Bible, and adapting them to the contemporary literature in Europe.

In 1997 the historical city-island of Trogir (called "Tragurium" in Latin when was one of the Dalmatian City-States and "Traù" in venetian) was inscribed in the UNESCO World Heritage List. "The orthogonal street plan of this island...was embellished by successive rulers with many fine public and domestic buildings and fortifications. Its beautiful Romanesque churches are complemented by the outstanding Renaissance and Baroque buildings from the Venetian period", says the UNESCO report. Trogir is the best-preserved Romanesque-Gothic complex not only in the Adriatic, but in all of Central Europe. Trogir's medieval core, surrounded by walls, comprises a venetian well-preserved castle and tower (Kamerlengo Castle) and a series of dwellings and palaces from the Romanesque, Gothic, Renaissance and Baroque periods. Trogir's grandest building is the church of St. Lawrence, whose main west portal is a masterpiece by Radovan, and the most significant work of the Romanesque-Gothic style in Croatia.

The Encyclopædia Britannica, Eleventh Edition states on page 774 "Antiquities" that:
"... from Italy (and Venice) came the Romanesque. The belfry of S. Maria, at Zara, erected in 1105, is first in a long list of Romanesque buildings. At Arbe there is a beautiful Romanesque campanile which also belongs to the 12th century; but the finest example in this style is the cathedral of Trau. The 14th century Dominican and Franciscan convents in Ragusa are also noteworthy. Romanesque lingered on in Dalmatia until it was displaced by Venetian Gothic in the early years of the 15th century. The influence of Venice was then at its height. Even in the relatively hostile Republic of Ragusa the Romanesque of the custom-house and Rectors' palace is combined with Venetian Gothic, while the graceful balconies and ogee windows of the Prijeki closely follow their Venetian models. In 1441 Giorgio Orsini of Zara, summoned from Venice to design the cathedral of Sebenico, brought with him the influence of the Italian Renaissance. The new forms which he introduced were eagerly imitated and developed by other architects, until the period of decadence - which virtually concludes the history of Dalmatian art - set in during the latter half of the 17th century. Special mention must be made of the carved woodwork, embroideries and plate preserved in many churches. The silver statuette and the reliquary of St. Biagio at Ragusa, and the silver ark of St. Simeon at Zara, are fine specimens of Italian jewelers' work, ranging in date from the 11th or 12th to the 17th century ...".

In the 19th century, the cultural influence from Venice and the Italian peninsula originated the editing in Zara  of the first Dalmatian newspaper, in Italian and Croatian: Il Regio Dalmata – Kraglski Dalmatin, founded and published by the Italian Bartolomeo Benincasa in 1806 AD. Furthermore, this Kraglski Dalmatin was stamped in the typography of Antonio Luigi Battara and was the first fully done in Croatian.

Governors
 
The Provveditore generale (Governor-general) was the official name of Venetian state officials supervising Dalmatia. The Governors of Dalmatia were based in Zara, while they were under direct supervision of the Provveditore Generale da Mar, who was based in Corfu and was directly controlled by the Signoria of Venice.

Main and most famous Venetian "Provveditori generali" (Governors-general) of Dalmatia:

See also

Venetian Albania
Republic of Venice
Kingdom of Croatia (Habsburg)
Stato da Màr

Notes

References

Sources
 
 
 
 
 
  Norwich, John Julius. A History of Venice. New York: A.A. Knopf, 1982. 
 
 Wolff, Larry. Venice and the Slavs: The Discovery of Dalmatia in the Age of Enlightenment. Stanford University Press. Stanford, 2002   
 Worldstatesmen: List of Dalmatia Governors

 
 
V
Dalmatia
16th century in Croatia
17th century in Croatia
18th century in Croatia
States and territories established in the 10th century
States and territories established in 1420
States and territories disestablished in 1797
1420 establishments in Europe
15th-century establishments in the Republic of Venice
1797 disestablishments in the Republic of Venice
Territories of the Republic of Venice